This is a list of New York City Ballet dancers.

Principal dancers

Soloists
This is a list of New York City Ballet soloists.

Corps de ballet
The following is a list of the current members of the corps de ballet.

 Victor Abreu
 Devin Alberda
 Marika Anderson
 Olivia Boisson
 Gilbert Bolden III
 Jacqueline Bologna 
 India Bradley
 LaJeromeny Brown
 Christina Clark
 Lauren Collett
 Nieve Corrigan
 Naomi Corti
 Uma Deming
 Gabriella Domini
 Savannah Durham
 Meaghan Dutton-O'Hara
 Jonathan Fahoury
 Christopher Grant
 Laine Habony
 Kennard Henson  
 Spartak Hoxha
 Rachel Hutsell
 Sasonah Huttenbach
 Baily Jones
 Alec Knight
 Ruby Lister
 Malorie Lundgren
 Jules Mabie
 Alston Macgill
 Mary Thomas MacKinnon 
 Olivia MacKinnon 
 Zoe Bliss Magnussen
 Jenelle Manzi
 Alexa Maxwell
 Samuel Melnikov
 Clara Miller
 Lars Nelson
 Davide Riccardo
 Andrew Scordato
 Kristen Segin
 Mary Elizabeth Sell
 Quinn Starner
 Mimi Staker 
 KJ Takahashi
 Kennedy Targosz
 Rommie Tomasini
 Claire Von Enck 
 Cainan Weber
 Andres Zuniga

Former corps de ballet 

 
 Dena Abergel
 Faye Arthurs
 Aesha Ash
 Briana Atkins
 Debra Austin
 Austin Bachman
 Callie Bachman
 Amy Barker
 Darius Barnes
 Toni Bentley
 Katie Bergstrom
 Saskia Beskow
 Jenny Blascovich
 Megan Bonneau
 Paul Boos
 Susan Borree
 Mary Helen Bowers
 Likolani Brown
 Willy Burmann
 Stephanie Chrosniak
 Emily Coates
 Maya Collins
 Cara Copeland
 Cameron Dieck
 Alina Drunova
 Sophie Flack
 Paul Frame
 Dorothy Froehlich
 Kurt Froman
 Kyle Froman
 Kaitlyn Gilliland
 Pauline Golbin
 Sam Greenberg
 Amanda Hankes 
 Brittany Hillyer 
 Darla Hoover
 Dana Jacobson
 Dara Johnson
 Viktoria Kay
 Glenn Keenan
 Ashlee Knapp
 Austin Laurent 
 Robert Lyon
 Lindy Mandradjieff
 Gwyneth Muller
 Courtney Muscroft
 Ellen Ostrom
 Vincent Paradiso
 Allen Peiffer 
 Roger Peterson
 Rachel Piskin
 David Prottas
 Matthew Renko
 Tabitha Rinko-Gay
 Shoshana Rosenfield
 Henry Seth
 Aaron Severini
 Briana Shepherd
 Kristin Sloan
 Lynne Stetson
 Joshua Thew
 Lara Tong
 Ulrik Trojaborg
 Max van der Sterre
 Elizabeth Walker
 Lydia Wellington
 Garielle Whittle
 Katharine Wildish
 Sarah-Rose Williams
 Deborah Wingert
 Stephanie Zungre

Janice Levin Award dancers
The Janice Levin Dancer Award was created in 2000 by an endowment gift from the late Mrs. Levin, and is bestowed annually on a promising member of NYCB's corps de ballet.

 2018 - 2019 – Kristen Segin
 2017 – 2018 – Harrison Coll
 2016 – 2017 – Claire Kretzschmar
 2015 – 2016 – Joseph Gordon
 2014 – 2015 – Ashly Isaacs
 2013 – 2014 – Harrison Ball
 2012 – 2013 – Lauren Lovette
 2011 – 2012 – Taylor Stanley
 2010 – 2011 – Anthony Huxley
 2009 – 2010 – Kaitlyn Gilliland
 2008 – 2009 – Kathryn Morgan
 2007 – 2008 – Tyler Angle
 2006 – 2007 – Tiler Peck
 2005 – 2006 – Sterling Hyltin
 2004 – 2005 – Teresa Reichlen
 2003 – 2004 – Daniel Ulbricht
 2002 – 2003 – Ashley Bouder
 2001 – 2002 – Carla Körbes
 2000 – 2001 – Abi Stafford

See also
 :Category:New York City Ballet dancers
In the Wings: Behind the Scenes at the New York City Ballet, 2007 book
 List of female dancers
 Alexandra Waterbury

References

Farewells

Reviews 

Principal dancers. List of New York City Ballet
Ballet-related lists
Lists of dancers
New York City-related lists